Yuri Andreyevich Zhdanov (20 August 1919 – 19 December 2006) was a Soviet and Russian chemistry professor and rector of the University of Rostov. He was the son of Soviet politician Andrei Zhdanov and a former husband of Joseph Stalin's daughter, Svetlana Alliluyeva.

Biography
Yuri Zhdanov was born on August 20, 1919 in Tver. He graduated from Moscow State University in 1941 with a degree in organic chemistry and served with the Red Army during World War II. He received a Ph.D. in 1948.

He married Svetlana Alliluyeva in the spring of 1949 "as a matter of hard common sense but without any special love or affection". Joseph Stalin respected the Zhdanov family and had always hoped the two families would be linked in marriage. They soon divorced in 1952. They had a daughter Yekaterina in 1950.

He joined Rostov State University in 1953, becoming a member of the Soviet Academy of Sciences and eventually Rector of the University. He was the author of numerous papers on organic chemistry.

In 1950 as the member of Soviet political leadership Zhdanov took active role in the implementation of the national policy of antisemitism. In his later year while being the Rector of Rostov State University and the Chair of the North-Caucasian Scientific Center of Higher Education he established the atmosphere of ethnic and religious tolerance. At that time most Soviet colleges and universities had severe quota on Jewish students and faculty. Many Jewish students from different regions of the Soviet Union were coming to Rostov-on-Don knowing that they would be admitted to local colleges and university. Most colleges and universities of the Rostov-on-Don region under the leadership of Zhdanov employed Jewish faculty and staff. Three out of five scientific research institutes of Rostov State University were headed by Jews.  

He died on 19 December 2006 in Rostov-on-Don.

Awards
Order "For Merit to the Fatherland", 4th class
Two Orders of Lenin
Order of the Patriotic War, 2nd class
Order of the Red Star
Order of the October Revolution
Two Orders of the Red Banner of Labour
Medal of Zhukov
 USSR State Prize

References

Sources

External links
 http://www.peoples.ru/science/professor/zhdanov/ page in Russian

1919 births
2006 deaths
20th-century Russian chemists
People from Tver
Stalin family
Central Committee of the Communist Party of the Soviet Union members
Corresponding Members of the Russian Academy of Sciences
Corresponding Members of the USSR Academy of Sciences
Moscow State University alumni
Academic staff of Moscow State University
Academic staff of Southern Federal University
Recipients of the Medal of Zhukov
Recipients of the Order "For Merit to the Fatherland", 4th class
Recipients of the Order of Lenin
Recipients of the Order of the Red Banner of Labour
Recipients of the Order of the Red Star
Recipients of the USSR State Prize
Organic chemists
Philosophers of science
Russian chemists
Russian memoirists
Soviet chemists
Soviet memoirists